Donald Louis Simon (September 22, 1930 – May 30, 2013) was a Canadian football player who played for the Edmonton Eskimos. He won the Grey Cup with them in 1954, 1955, and 1956.

References

1930 births
2013 deaths
Edmonton Elks players
Players of Canadian football from Alberta
Canadian football people from Edmonton